The Maldives has numerous national symbols, including a national flower, tree and animal, which were adopted in 1985. The Maldivian national flag and emblem, adopted in 1965 are also considered national symbols.

Symbols
The following is a list of the national symbols of Maldives.

Official Symbols

Official Symbols

References